Wiel Hendrickx (3 February 1908 – 18 March 1984) was a Dutch equestrian. He competed in two events at the 1952 Summer Olympics.

References

1908 births
1984 deaths
Dutch male equestrians
Olympic equestrians of the Netherlands
Equestrians at the 1952 Summer Olympics
Sportspeople from Limburg (Netherlands)